Traffic in Crime is a 1946 American action film directed by Lesley Selander, written by David Lang, and starring Kane Richmond, Anne Nagel, Adele Mara, Wade Crosby, Wilton Graff and Roy Barcroft. It was released on June 28, 1946, by Republic Pictures.

Plot

Cast   
Kane Richmond as Sam Wire
Anne Nagel as Ann Marlowe
Adele Mara as Silk Cantrell
Wade Crosby as Dumbo 
Wilton Graff as Nick Cantrell
Roy Barcroft as Insp. Tip Hogan
Dick Curtis as Jake Schultz
Arthur Loft as Police Chief Jim Murphy
Harry Cheshire as Dan Marlowe 
Robert J. Wilke as Hogan's Driver 
Earle Hodgins as Bartender
Horace Murphy as Joe
Charles Sullivan as Cab Driver
Ernie Adams as Counter Man
Budd Buster as Watchman

References

External links 
 

1946 films
1940s English-language films
American action films
1940s action films
Republic Pictures films
Films directed by Lesley Selander
American black-and-white films
1940s American films